Axillarin is an O-methylated flavonol. It can be found in Pulicaria crispa, Filifolium sibiricum, Inula britannica, Wyethia bolanderi in Balsamorhiza macrophylla and in Tanacetum vulgare. It can also be synthesized.

Glycosides 
Axillarin 7-O-β-D-glucoside can be found in Tagetes mendocina, a plant used in traditional herbal medicine the Andean provinces of Argentina.

References 

O-methylated flavonols
Catechols
Resorcinols